"Plant of Doom" is an episode of Stingray, a British Supermarionation television series created by Gerry and Sylvia Anderson, filmed by their production company AP Films and originally broadcast on Associated Television. Written by Alan Fennell and directed by David Elliott, it was the second episode to be produced but was first broadcast on 23 May 1965, towards the end of the series' original run, as the 34th episode.

The series follows the missions of the World Aquanaut Security Patrol (WASP), an organisation responsible for policing the Earth's oceans in the mid-2060s. Headquartered at the self-contained city of Marineville on the West Coast of North America, the WASP operates a fleet of vessels led by Stingray: a combat submarine crewed by Captain Troy Tempest, Lieutenant "Phones" and Marina, a mute young woman from under the sea. Stingrays adventures bring it into contact with undersea civilisations – some friendly, others hostile – as well as mysterious natural phenomena. The WASP's most powerful enemy is King Titan, ruler of the ocean floor city of Titanica.

"Plant of Doom" sees Titan, outraged by his slave Marina's defection to the WASP, plot his revenge by ordering his agent X-2-Zero to deliver a dangerous plant to Marina's father.

Plot
Outraged by Marina's betrayal (as seen in the first episode), Titan (voiced by Ray Barrett) vows revenge and turns to the fish god Teufel for guidance. Teufel opens his mouth, causing a nearby plant to emit powerful fumes that consume the surrounding air, almost suffocating Titan. Recovering, Titan realises that Teufel has given him a weapon to use.

At Marineville, Captain Troy Tempest (voiced by Don Mason) sees Marina crying and realises that she is feeling homesick. With the permission of Commander Shore (voiced by Ray Barrett), he, Phones (voiced by Robert Easton) and Marina set off in Stingray for the underwater city of Pacifica, ruled by Marina's father Aphony.

From his base on Lemoy Island, Surface Agent X-2-Zero (voiced by Robert Easton) alerts Titan to Stingrays movements. Sensing an opportunity to get his revenge, Titan dispatches X-2-Zero to Pacifica with the plant, now sealed in a jar. Meanwhile, he has a Mechanical Fish attack Stingray to delay Troy, Phones and Marina. After a tense chase, Troy and Phones destroy the Mechanical Fish with Stingrays torpedoes.

Reaching Pacifica, X-2-Zero, posing as a simple messenger, presents the plant to Aphony as a symbol of good faith and informs him of Marina's imminent return. He then leaves before Stingray arrives. As Aphony treats Troy, Phones and Marina to a lavish meal, Marina takes an interest in the plant. After the meal, it appears that she wishes to stay in Pacifica, so Troy and Phones start the journey back to Marineville alone. However, Marina has a last-minute change of heart and swims after Stingray, bringing the plant on board with her. On returning to Marineville she gives it to Atlanta (voiced by Lois Maxwell) as a present.

Returning to her quarters, Atlanta takes the plant out of its jar. She passes out from its fumes but is saved from death when Troy breaks into the room. Suspicion falls on Marina, but Troy refuses to accept that she is a spy. The team decide to test Marina's loyalty by summoning her to Atlanta's quarters with the plant still present. Marina fails to smash the plant and passes out, proving her innocence. Troy disposes of the plant and the team apologise to Marina for doubting her. Later, Troy, Phones and Shore watch as Atlanta teaches Marina how to play the piano.

Production
The original script for "Plant of Doom", which Fennell wrote before principal photography on Stingray had begun, contained enough material for an episode 50 minutes long and was subsequently cut. Some of the deleted material was intended to remind viewers of the romance triangle between Marina, Troy and Atlanta, while also hinting at the possibility of Phones being attracted to Marina. The original script also explained how X-2-Zero travels from Lemoy to Titanica.

During the filming, Elliott did not always follow the scripted camera movements, replacing elaborate tracking shots with simpler establishing shots. The underwater chase sequence features a complex model shot in which Stingray briefly leaps out of the sea, followed by the Mechanical Fish. Although the speed and precise movements required made the shot a technical challenge, to the surprise of special effects director Derek Meddings it was filmed in a single take. The shot was later incorporated into the series' title sequence.

The episode's incidental music was recorded on 6 September 1963 at Pye Studios with a 30-member band. Music for "Sea of Oil" was recorded in the same session.

Broadcast and reception
Chris Bentley notes the unusual position of "Plant of Doom" in the original episode running order, pointing out that as it is set immediately after the pilot it should have been transmitted as the second episode. Ian Fryer of FAB magazine suggests that ATV regarded "Plant of Doom" as a good episode and held it back solely for reasons of audience measurement: because viewing figures tend to fall in the middle of a series, episode running orders may be changed so that "stronger" episodes air at the start and end of a series and "weaker" ones in the middle.

The BBC repeats of Stingray in the 1990s and 2000s used the running order devised by original distributors ITC, which matches the order of production. Consequently, for these repeats "Plant of Doom" was broadcast as the second episode.

Critical response
Writing for the fanzine Andersonic, Vincent Law suggests that the focus on Marina's desire to return home makes "Plant of Doom" an unusual episode of Stingray, noting that most of the episodes were "written as straightforward adventures, the heroes' journey taking precedence over their needs".

References

External links

1965 British television episodes
Science fiction television episodes
Stingray (1964 TV series)
Television episodes set on fictional islands